is a Japanese manga artist from Tokyo, Japan. She is notable for the creation of Kodomo no Jikan, the first of her works selected to be translated into English – though the publication of the English version was cancelled by the licensee, Seven Seas Entertainment, due to concerns as to North American reaction to controversial content, and was never released. However, in late 2016 it was picked up by digitalmanga, and funded for translation through a Kickstarter campaign, with the digital version readily available on Project Hentai. It is also the first of her works to be adapted into an anime.

Works
 2000-2007
 1996-1997
 2008,2010
 1993-1994
 1999-2001
 2005-2013
 2009
 1997-1998
 1994
 1999
 1999
 2003
2001-2004
 1992-1993
 1995-1996

References

External links
 Kaworu Watashiya's personal website 
 
 

Manga artists from Tokyo
Living people
1972 births
Women manga artists